Mathematical anxiety, also known as math phobia, is anxiety about one's ability to do mathematics.

Math Anxiety
Mark H. Ashcraft defines math anxiety as "a feeling of tension, apprehension, or fear that interferes with math performance" (2002, p. 1). It is a phenomenon that is often considered when examining students' problems in mathematics. According to the American Psychological Association, mathematical anxiety is often linked to testing anxiety. This anxiety can cause distress and likely causes a dislike and avoidance of all math-related tasks. The academic study of math anxiety originates as early as the 1950s, where Mary Fides Gough introduced the term mathemaphobia to describe the phobia-like feelings of many towards mathematics. The first math anxiety measurement scale was developed by Richardson and Suinn in 1972. Since this development, several researchers have examined math anxiety in empirical studies. Hembree (1990) conducted a meta-analysis of 151 studies concerning math anxiety. Hembree also suggests that math anxiety is directly connected with math avoidance.

Ashcraft (2002) suggests that highly anxious math students will avoid situations in which they have to perform mathematical tasks. Unfortunately, math avoidance results in less competency, exposure and math practice, leaving students more anxious and mathematically unprepared to achieve. In college and university, anxious math students take fewer math courses and tend to feel negative towards the subject. In fact, Ashcraft found that the correlation between math anxiety and variables such as confidence and motivation are strongly negative.

According to Schar, because math anxiety can cause math avoidance, an empirical dilemma arises. For instance, when a highly math-anxious student performs disappointingly on a math question, it could be due to math anxiety or the lack of competency in math because of math avoidance. Ashcraft determined that by administering a test that becomes increasingly more mathematically challenging, he noticed that even highly math-anxious individuals do well on the first portion of the test measuring performance. However, on the latter and more difficult portion of the test, there was a stronger negative relationship between accuracy and math anxiety.

According to the research found at the University of Chicago by Sian Beilock and her group, math anxiety is not simply about being bad at math. After using brain scans, scholars confirmed that the anticipation or the thought of solving math actually causes math anxiety. The brain scans showed that the area of the brain that is triggered when someone has math anxiety overlaps the same area of the brain where bodily harm is registered. And Trezise and Reeve show that students' math anxiety can fluctuate throughout the duration of a math class.

Performance
The impact of mathematics anxiety on mathematics performance has been studied in more recent literature.  An individual with math anxiety does not necessarily lack ability in mathematics, rather, they cannot perform to their full potential due to the interfering symptoms of their anxiety. Math anxiety manifests itself in a variety of ways, including physical, psychological, and behavioral symptoms, that can all disrupt a student's mathematical performance.  The strong negative correlation between high math anxiety and low achievement is often thought to be due to the impact of math anxiety on working memory.  Working memory has a limited capacity. A large portion of this capacity is dedicated to problem solving when solving mathematical tasks.  However, in individuals with math anxiety, much of this space is taken up by anxious thoughts, thus compromising the individual's ability to perform. In addition, a frequent reliance in schools on high-stakes and timed testing, where students tend to feel the most anxiety, can lead to lower achievement for math anxious individuals. Programme for International Student Assessment (PISA) results demonstrate that students experiencing high math anxiety demonstrate mathematics scores that are 34 points lower than students who do not have math anxiety, equivalent to one full year of school.  Besides, researchers Elisa Cargnelutti et al show that the influence of  mathematical anxiety on math-related performance increases over time due to the accumulation of passive experience in the subject or other factors like more requirements on mathematics as children grow up. These findings demonstrate the clear link between math anxiety and reduced levels of achievement, suggesting that alleviating math anxiety may lead to a marked improvement in student achievement.

Anxiety rating scale
A rating scale for mathematics anxiety was written about in 1972 by Richardson and Suinn. Richardson and Suinn defined mathematical anxiety as "feelings of apprehension and tension concerning manipulation of numbers and completion of mathematical problems in various contexts". Richardson and Suinn introduced the MARS (Mathematics Anxiety Rating Scale) in 1972.  Elevated scores on the MARS test translate to high math anxiety.  The authors presented the normative data, including a mean score of 215.38 with a standard deviation of 65.29, collected from 397 students that replied to an advertisement for behavior therapy treatment for math anxiety.  For test-retest reliability, the Pearson product-moment coefficient was used and a score of 0.85 was calculated, which was favorable and comparable to scores found on other anxiety tests.  Richardson and Suinn validated the construct of this test by sharing previous results from three other studies that were very similar to the results achieved in this study.   They also administered the Differential Aptitude Test, a 10-minute math test including simple to complex problems.

Calculation of the Pearson product-moment correlation coefficient between the MARS test and Differential Aptitude Test scores was −0.64 (p < .01), indicating that higher MARS scores relate to lower math test scores and "since high anxiety interferes with performance, and poor performance produces anxiety, this result provides evidence that the MARS does measure mathematics anxiety".  This test was intended for use in diagnosing math anxiety, testing efficacy of different math anxiety treatment approaches and possibly designing an anxiety hierarchy to be used in desensitization treatments.  The MARS test is of interest to those in counseling psychology and the test is used profusely in math anxiety research.  It is available in several versions of varying length and is considered psychometrically sound.  Other tests are often given to measure different dimensionalities of math anxiety, such as Elizabeth Fennema and Julia Sherman's Fennema-Sherman Mathematics Attitudes Scales (FSMAS).  The FSMAS evaluates nine specific domains using Likert-type scales: attitude toward success, mathematics as a male domain, mother's attitude, father's attitude, teacher's attitude, confidence in learning mathematics, mathematics anxiety, affectance motivation and mathematics usefulness.  Despite the introduction of newer instrumentation, the use of the MARS test appears to be the educational standard for measuring math anxiety due to its specificity and prolific use.

Math and culture
While there are overarching similarities concerning the acquisition of math skills, researchers have shown that children's mathematical abilities differ across countries. In Canada, students score substantially lower in math problem-solving and operations than students in Korea, India and Singapore. Researchers have conducted thorough comparisons between countries and determined that in some areas, such as Taiwan and Japan, parents place more emphasis on effort rather than one's innate intellectual ability in school success. By placing a higher emphasis on effort rather than one's innate intellectual ability, they are helping their child develop a growth mindset. People who develop a growth mindset believe that everyone has the ability to grow their intellectual ability, learn from their mistakes, and become more resilient learners. Rather than getting stuck on a problem and giving up, students with a growth mindset try other strategies to solve the problem. A growth mindset can benefit everyone, not just people trying to solve math computations. Moreover, parents in these countries tend to set higher expectations and standards for their children. In turn, students spend more time on homework and value homework more than American children.

In addition, researchers Jennifer L. Brown et al. shows that difference in level of mathematical anxiety among different countries may result from varying degrees of the courses. In the same culture, there is little difference in anxiety scale that is associated with gender, while the anxiety is more related with its type. Samples show greater degree of anxiety at subscale

MEA (Mathematical Evaluation Anxiety) compared with LMA (Learning Mathematical Anxiety).

Math and gender 
Another difference in mathematic abilities often explored in research concerns gender disparities. There has been research examining gender difference in performance on standardized tests across various countries. Beller and Gafni's have shown that children at approximately nine years of age do not show consistent gender difference in relation to math skills. However, in 17 out of the 20 countries examined in this study, 13-year-old boys tended to score higher than girls. Moreover, mathematics is often labeled as a masculine ability; as a result, girls often have low confidence in their math capabilities. These gender stereotypes can reinforce low confidence in girls and can cause math anxiety as research has shown that performance on standardized math tests is affected by one's confidence. As a result, educators have been trying to abolish this stereotype by fostering confidence in math in all students in order to avoid math anxiety.

While on the other hand, results obtained by Szczygiel, Monika show that girls have a higher level of anxiety on testing and in total, although there is no gender difference in general learning math anxiety. Therefore, the gender gap in math anxiety may result from the type of anxiety. Tests triggers greater anxiety in girls compared with boys, but they feel same level of anxiety learning math.

Math pedagogy
The principles of mathematics are generally understood at an early age; preschoolers can comprehend the majority of principles underlying counting. By kindergarten, it is common for children to use counting in a more sophisticated manner by adding and subtracting numbers. While kindergarteners tend to use their fingers to count, this habit is soon abandoned and replaced with a more refined and efficient strategy; children begin to perform addition and subtraction mentally at approximately six years of age. When children reach approximately eight years of age, they can retrieve answers to mathematical equations from memory. With proper instruction, most children acquire these basic mathematical skills and are able to solve more complex mathematical problems with sophisticated training. (Kail & Zolner, 2005).

High-risk teaching styles are often explored to gain a better understanding of math anxiety. Goulding, Rowland, and Barber (2002) suggest that there are linkages between a teacher's lack of subject knowledge and ability to  plan teaching material effectively. These findings suggest that teachers that do not have a sufficient background in mathematics may struggle with the development of comprehensive lesson plans for their students. Similarly, Laturner's research (2002) shows that teachers with certification in math are more likely to be passionate and committed about teaching math than those without certification. However, those without certification vary in their commitment to the profession depending on coursework preparation.

A study conducted by Kawakami, Steele, Cifa, Phills, and Dovidio (2008) examined attitudes towards math and behavior during math examinations. The study examined the effect of extensive training in teaching women how to approach math. The results showed that women who were trained to approach rather than avoid math showed a positive implicit attitude towards math. These findings were only consistent with women low in initial identification with math.  This study was replicated with women who were either encouraged to approach math or who received neutral training.  Results were consistent and demonstrated that women taught to approach math had an implicit positive attitude and completed more math problems than women taught to approach math in a neutral manner.

Johns, Schmader, and Martens (2005) conducted a study in which they examined the effect of teaching stereotype threat as a means of improving women's math performance. The researchers concluded that women tended to perform worse than men when problems were described as math equations. However, women did not differ from men when the test sequence was described as problem solving or in a condition in which they learned about stereotype threats. This research has practical implications. The results suggested that teaching students about stereotype threat could offer a practical means of reducing its detrimental effects and lead to an improvement in a girl's performance and mathematical ability, leading the researchers to conclude that educating female teachers about stereotype threat can reduce its negative effects in the classroom.

Common beliefs

According to Margaret Murray, female mathematicians in the United States have almost always been a minority.  Although the exact difference fluctuates with the times, as she has explored in her book Women Becoming Mathematicians: Creating a Professional Identity in Post-World War II America, "Since 1980, women have earned over 17 percent of the mathematics doctorates.... [In The United States]". The trends in gender are by no means clear, but perhaps parity is still a way to go. Since 1995, studies have shown that the gender gap favored males in most mathematical standardized testing as boys outperformed girls in 15 out of 28 countries. However, as of 2015 the gender gap has almost been reversed, showing an increase in female presence. This is being caused by women's steadily increasing their performance on math and science testing and enrollment, but also from males' losing ground at the same time. This role reversal can largely be associated with the gender normative stereotypes that are found in the Science, technology, engineering, and mathematics (STEM) field, deeming "who math is for" and "who STEM careers are for". These stereotypes can fuel mathematical anxiety that is already present among young female populations. Thus parity will take more work to overcome mathematical anxiety and this is one reason why women in mathematics are role models for younger women.

In schools

According to John Taylor Gatto, as expounded in several lengthy books, modern Western schools were deliberately designed during the late 19th century to create an environment which is ideal for fostering fear and anxiety, and for preventing or delaying learning. Many who are sympathetic to Gatto's thesis regard his position as unnecessarily extreme. Diane Ravitch, former assistant secretary of education during the George H. W. Bush administration, agrees with Gatto up to a point, conceding that there is an element of social engineering (i.e. manufacture of compliant citizenry) in the construction of the American education system, which prioritizes conformance over learning.

The role of attachment has been suggested as having an impact in the development of the anxiety. Children with an insecure attachment style were more likely to demonstrate the anxiety.

Math used to be taught as a right and wrong subject and as if getting the right answer were paramount.  In contrast to most subjects, mathematics problems almost always have a right answer but there are many ways to obtain the answer.  Previously, the subject was often taught as if there were a right way to solve the problem and any other approaches would be wrong, even if students got the right answer. Thankfully, mathematics has evolved and so has teaching it. Students used to have higher anxiety because of the way math was taught.   "Teachers benefit children most when they encourage them to share their thinking process and justify their answers out loud or in writing as they perform math operations. ... With less of an emphasis on right or wrong and more of an emphasis on process, teachers can help alleviate students' anxiety about math".

Theoretical "solutions"

There have been many studies that show parent involvement in developing a child's educational processes is essential. A student's success in school is increased if their parents are involved in their education both at home and school (Henderson & Map, 2002). As a result, one of the easiest ways to reduce math anxiety is for the parent to be more involved in their child's education. In addition, research has shown that a parent's perception on mathematics influences their child's perception and achievement in mathematics (Yee & Eccles, 1988).

Furthermore, studies by Herbert P. Ginsburg, Columbia University, show the influence of parents' and teachers' attitudes on "'the child's expectations in that area of learning.'... It is less the actual teaching and more the attitude and expectations of the teacher or parents that count".  This is further supported by a survey of Montgomery County, Maryland students who "pointed to their parents as the primary force behind the interest in mathematics".

Claudia Zaslavsky contends that math has two components.  The first component is to calculate the answer.  This component also has two subcomponents, namely the answer and the process or method used to determine the answer.  Focusing more on the process or method enables students to make mistakes, but not 
'fail at math'.  The second component is to understand the mathematical concepts that underlay the problem being studied.  "... and in this respect studying mathematics is much more like studying, say, music or painting than it is like studying history or biology."

Amongst others supporting this viewpoint is the work of Eugene Geist. Geist's recommendations include focusing on the concepts rather than the right answer and letting students work on their own and discuss their solutions before the answer is given.

National Council of Teachers of Mathematics (NCTM) (1989, 1995b) suggestions for teachers seeking to prevent math anxiety include:
 Accommodating for different learning styles
 Creating a variety of testing environments
 Designing positive experiences in math classes
 Refraining from tying self-esteem to success with math
 Emphasizing that everyone makes mistakes in mathematics
 Making math relevant
 Letting students have some input into their own evaluations
 Allowing for different social approaches to learning mathematics
 Emphasizing the importance of original, quality thinking rather than rote manipulation of formulas

Hackworth (1992) suggests that the following activities can help students in reducing and mitigating mathematical anxiety:
 Discuss and write about math feelings; 
 Become acquainted with good math instruction, as well as study techniques; 
 Recognize what type of information needs to be learned; 
 Be an active learner, and create problem-solving techniques; 
 Evaluate your own learning; 
 Develop calming/positive ways to deal with fear of math, including visualization, positive messages, relaxation techniques, frustration breaks;
 Use gradual, repeated success to build math confidence in students
B R Alimin and D B Widjajanti (2019)  recommend teachers: Never make students embarrassed in front of the class
 Build harmony and friendship between teachers and students
 Give hints to students so that they can learn from mistakes
 Encourage students not to give up when they encounter with challenges
 Teach students to help each other working on math problem
 
Several studies have shown that relaxation techniques can be used to help alleviate anxiety related to mathematics.  In her workbook Conquering Math Anxiety, Cynthia Arem offers specific strategies to reduce math avoidance and anxiety.  One strategy she advocates for is relaxation exercises and indicates that  by practicing relaxation techniques on a regular basis for 10–20 minutes students can significantly reduce their anxiety.    
 
Dr. Edmundo Jacobson's Progressive Muscle Relaxation taken from the book Mental Toughness Training for Sports, Loehr (1986) can be used in a modified form to reduce anxiety as posted on the website HypnoGenesis.

According to Mina Bazargan and Mehdi Amiri, Modular Cognitive Behavior Therapy (MCBT) can reduce the level of mathematical anxiety and increase students' self-esteem.

Visualization has also been used effectively to help reduce math anxiety.  Arem has a chapter that deals with reducing test anxiety and advocates the use of visualization.  In her chapter titled Conquer Test Anxiety (Chapter 9) she has specific exercises devoted to visualization techniques to help the student feel calm and confident during testing.

Studies have shown students learn best when they are active rather than passive learners.

The theory of multiple intelligences suggests that there is a need for addressing different learning styles. Math lessons can be tailored for visual/spatial, logical/mathematics, musical, auditory, body/kinesthetic, interpersonal and intrapersonal and verbal/linguistic learning styles. This theory of learning styles has never been demonstrated to be true in controlled trials. Studies show no evidence to support tailoring lessons to an individual students learning style to be beneficial.

New concepts can be taught through play acting, cooperative groups, visual aids, hands on activities or information technology. To help with learning statistics, there are many applets found on the Internet that help students learn about many things from probability distributions to linear regression. These applets are commonly used in introductory statistics classes, as many students benefit from using them.

Active learners ask critical questions, such as: Why do we do it this way, and not that way? Some teachers may find these questions annoying or difficult to answer, and indeed may have been trained to respond to such questions with hostility and contempt, designed to instill fear. Better teachers respond eagerly to these questions, and use them to help the students deepen their understanding by examining alternative methods so the students can choose for themselves which method they prefer. This process can result in meaningful class discussions.  Talking is the way in which students increase their understanding and command of math.   Teachers can give students insight as to why they learn certain content by asking students questions such as "what purpose is served by solving this problem?" and "why are we being asked to learn this?"

Reflective journals help students develop metacognitive skills by having them think about their understanding.  According to Pugalee, writing helps students organize their thinking which helps them better understand mathematics.  Moreover, writing in mathematics classes helps students problem solve and improve mathematical reasoning. When students know how to use mathematical reasoning, they are less anxious about solving problems.

Children learn best when math is taught in a way that is relevant to their everyday lives. Children enjoy experimenting. To learn mathematics in any depth, students should be engaged in exploring, conjecturing, and thinking, as well as in rote learning of rules and procedures.

See also

Cognitive science of mathematics
Dyscalculia, a specific developmental disorder
Educational psychology
Foreign language anxiety
Learning theory
Primary education
Pygmalion effect, the phenomenon whereby higher expectations lead to an increase in performance
Stage fright
Test anxiety

References

Game, P. (n.d.). Overcoming math anxiety: 12 evidence-based tips that work. Prodigy Education. Retrieved November 30, 2021, from https://www.prodigygame.com/main-en/blog/math-anxiety/. 
Math tests. Overcoming Math Anxiety - About. (n.d.). Retrieved November 30, 2021, from https://missioncollege.edu/depts/math/resources/math-tests/math-anxiety.html. 
>

External links 
 Online information about and demonstration of a short mathematics anxiety test
 Defence Mechanisms against Mathematics

Mathematics education
Elementary mathematics
Educational psychology